Baldwin Township may refer to:

In Canada
 Baldwin Township, Ontario

In the United States
 Baldwin Township, Iosco County, Michigan
 Baldwin Township, Delta County, Michigan
 Baldwin Township, Sherburne County, Minnesota
 Baldwin Township, North Carolina, in Chatham County
 Baldwin Township, Barnes County, North Dakota
 Baldwin Township, Allegheny County, Pennsylvania

Township name disambiguation pages